Eupithecia subcolorata is a moth in the family Geometridae first described by George Duryea Hulst in 1898. It is found in western North America, from British Columbia south to Arizona and New Mexico.

The wingspan is about 22 mm. The forewings are pale grey with dark grey markings and a black discal spot. Adults are on wing in late spring and early summer.

The larvae feed on the foliage of Vaccinium species.

References

Moths described in 1898
subcolorata
Moths of North America